Executive Order 13936, entitled "The President’s Executive Order on Hong Kong Normalization", is an executive order signed by U.S. President Donald Trump on July 14, 2020. On the same day Trump had signed into law Hong Kong Autonomy Act, one of the laws from which the order derives authority. The act and the executive order are the US's response to the imposition of a controversial national security law in Hong Kong by the Standing Committee of the National People's Congress of China on June 30, 2020, which was described as "an unusual and extraordinary threat [...] to the national security, foreign policy, and economy of the United States" in the preamble.

According to Trump, he said the executive order was to "hold China accountable for its aggressive actions against the people of Hong Kong", and Hong Kong would be treated the same as China. The order directs government agencies to eliminate preferential treatments given to Hong Kong as compared to Mainland China.

Background

The Hong Kong Policy Act of 1992 (HKPA), last amended by the Hong Kong Human Rights and Democracy Act of 2019, is the groundwork for the US policies that maintain relations with Hong Kong as separate from Mainland China, to the extent consistent with the 1984 Sino-British Joint Declaration, after the transfer of sovereignty over Hong Kong. While existing US laws and certain international agreements continue to apply to the Hong Kong Special Administrative Region after July 1997, section 202 of the act allows the US president to issue an executive order to suspend such treatments if he determines that Hong Kong "is not sufficiently autonomous to justify treatment" different from that accorded China under US laws.

In May 2020, after the Chinese National People's Congress decision on Hong Kong national security legislation was adopted, Secretary of State Mike Pompeo reported to the US Congress that Hong Kong was no longer autonomous. Following the enactment of the Hong Kong national security law by Standing Committee of the National People's Congress in June 2020, the US Congress promptly and unanimously passed the Hong Kong Autonomy Act.

On 7 July 2021 and 11 July 2022, US President Joe Biden extended the executive order for another year.

Provisions 
The measures introduced in the executive order include:
 Export control
All of Hong Kong's license under the Export Administration Regulations that are not available to China are to be revoked
The export of "U.S.-origin defense equipment" to Hong Kong is to be ended under the Arms Export Control Act
 SanctionsThe Secretary of the Treasury or the Secretary of State can impose sanctions on foreign persons who are:
engaged in developing, adopting, or implementing the Hong Kong national security law
engaged in undermining the democracy, threatening the autonomy, imposing censorship or committing serious human rights abuse in Hong Kong
leaders or officials of a government or private entities engaged in the above activities 
 Law EnforcementNotice of intent is given to:
 suspend the Agreement for the Surrender of Fugitive Offenders
 terminate the Agreement for the Transfer of Sentenced Persons
 end the provision of training to the Hong Kong Police at the International Law Enforcement Academies
 Travel and ImmigrationHong Kong is no longer treated as separate from China:
 for the purpose of numerical limitations on immigration under the Immigration Act of 1990
 with respect to the duration of nonimmigrant visas under Immigration and Nationality Act of 1952
 for the Diversity Immigrant Visa program (commonly known as the green card lottery)
 for the eligibility of its residents to Visa waiver programs of Guam and the Northern Mariana Islands (both holders of HKSAR Passport and British National (Overseas) passport are affected)
Other provisions
Hong Kong is to be treated as the same as China by the Committee on Foreign Investment in the United States in its annual reporting
A notice of intent is to be given to terminate a 1989 bilateral agreement granting reciprocal exemption of income tax 
The Fulbright exchange program with Hong Kong and China is to be terminated
The cooperation between the U.S. Geological Survey and the Chinese University of Hong Kong's Institute of Space and Earth Information Science is discontinued

Implementations

Sanctions 

On August 7, 2020, pursuant to the order, the US Department of the Treasury imposed sanctions on 11 officials for "undermining Hong Kong's autonomy and restricting the freedom of expression or assembly", including:
Carrie Lam, former Chief Executive of Hong Kong, member of the Executive Council, member of the Committee for Safeguarding National Security (CSNS), who pushed the 2019 Hong Kong extradition bill
Chris Tang, Commissioner of Hong Kong Police Force, member of the CSNS, under whose leadership the police besieged the Hong Kong Polytechnic University in November 2019
Stephen Lo, Former Commissioner of Hong Kong Police Force, under whose leadership 4000 protesters were arrested and 1600 were injured
John Lee, Current Chief Executive of Hong Kong, member of the Executive Council, member of the CSNS, who introduced a new police unit dedicated to enforcing the Hong Kong National Security Law 
Teresa Cheng, Former Secretary for Justice of Hong Kong, member of the Executive Council, member of the CSNS
Erick Tsang, Secretary for Constitutional and Mainland Affairs of Hong Kong, member of the Executive Council
Xia Baolong, Director of the Hong Kong and Macao Affairs Office of the State Council of China
Zhang Xiaoming, deputy director of the Hong Kong and Macao Affairs Office of the State Council of China
Luo Huining, Director of the Hong Kong Liaison Office of the Chinese government
Zheng Yanxiong, director, Office for Safeguarding National Security in Hong Kong
Eric Chan, Secretary General of the CSNS
On 9 November 2020, four more individuals who were responsible for National Security were sanctioned:

 Li Jiangzhou, deputy director of the Office for Safeguarding National Security
 Edwina Lau Chi-wai, head of the National Security Division of the Hong Kong Police Force
 Steve Li Kwai-Wah, Senior Superintendent of the Hong Kong Police Force
 Deng Zhonghua,  deputy director of the Hong Kong & Macau Affairs Office (HKMAO)

On December 7, 2020, pursuant to the order, the US Department of the Treasury imposed sanctions on the entire 14 Vice Chairpersons of the National People's Congress of China, for "undermining Hong Kong's autonomy and restricting the freedom of expression or assembly", including:

 Cai Dafeng
 Cao Jianming
 Chen Zhu
 Padma Choling
 Ding Zhongli
 Hao Mingjin
 Arken Imirbaki
 Ji Bingxuan
 Shen Yueyue
 Wan Exiang
 Wang Chen
 Wang Dongming
 Wu Weihua
 Zhang Chunxian

On 15 January 2021, 6 more individuals were sanctioned, including:

 You Quan, Vice Chairman of the Central Leading Group on Hong Kong and Macau Affairs
 Sun Wenqing AKA Sun Qingye, deputy director of the Office for Safeguarding National Security in the HKSAR
 Tam Yiu-Chung, Hong Kong delegate to the National People's Congress Standing Committee
 Frederic Choi Chin-Pang, official in the National Security Division of the Hong Kong Police
 Kelvin Kong Hok-lai, official in the National Security Division of the Hong Kong Police
 Andrew Kan Kai-yan, official in the National Security Division of the Hong Kong Police
On 16 July 2021, all 7 deputy directors of the Hong Kong Liaison Office were sanctioned for their role in reducing Hong Kong's autonomy, pursuant to the 2020 Hong Kong Autonomy Act:

 Chen Dong
 Yang Jianping
 Qiu Hong
 Lu Xinning
 Tan Tieniu
 He Jing
 Yin Zonghua

As a result of their inclusion in the Specially Designated Nationals List, all of the property and interests in property in the United States are blocked for the sanctioned and must be reported to the Office of Foreign Assets Control. All United States citizens are prohibited from transactions (including the contribution or provision of funds, goods or services) involving the property or interest of the eleven sanctioned persons.

Country of origin marking of products 
The executive order suspended the application of section 201(a) of HKPA to section 304 of the Tariff Act of 1930 (19 U.S. Code § 1304), which stipulates that every article of foreign origin shall be marked the English name of the country of origin. On August 11, 2020, US Customs and Border Protection (USCBP) announced that the imported goods produced in Hong Kong could no longer indicate themselves as "Made in Hong Kong" after September 25, but must indicate "China" as the country of origin instead. This reversed the practice announced by the then-US Customs Service in June 1997, which determined that goods from Hong Kong should continue to indicate their origin as "Hong Kong" after July 1, 1997.

This change does not affect the reporting for purposes of assessing duties under the Harmonized Tariff Schedule of the United States.

Suspension or termination of three bilateral agreements 
On August 18, 2020, the Consulate General of the United States in Hong Kong notified the government of Hong Kong that the United States had suspended or terminated three bilateral agreements: for the surrender of fugitive offenders, for the transfer of sentenced persons and for reciprocal tax exemptions on income derived from the international operation of ships. The US Department of State referred to this as part of the implementation measures set forth in the executive order.

Responses

Signing of the executive order
China's ministry of foreign affairs criticized the US for interfering in "purely China’s internal affairs", namely the implementation of a law that safeguards the country's national security. The spokesperson urged to US to "correct its mistakes", otherwise China will give "firm response" and impose sanctions on relevant US persons.

The HKSAR government, in addition to reiterating the necessity of the national security law, said the SAR's special status as a separate customs territory, under the "One Country, Two Systems" principle, is conferred by the PRC Constitution and the Hong Kong Basic Law. It warned the US that unliteral measures that limit normal business activities would affect its own interests, and stressed that the measures imposed under Hong Kong Autonomy Act and the executive order "do not have any legal effect" on Hong Kong's financial institutions. It might also consider taking actions against the US under the rules of the World Trade Organization (WTO).

Countersanctions
On August 11, 2020, China imposed sanctions without specification on eleven US individuals, namely Senators Marco Rubio, Ted Cruz, Josh Hawley, Tom Cotton and Pat Toomey, Representative Chris Smith, Carl Gershman (president of the National Endowment for Democracy), Derek Mitchell (president of the National Democratic Institute), Daniel Twining (president of the International Republican Institute), Kenneth Roth (executive director of the Human Rights Watch) and Michael Abramowitz (president of Freedom House). The spokesman of the foreign ministry said the sanctioned "behaved badly" on Hong Kong-related issues. Rubio, Cruz and Smith had been put on a travel ban by China.

Criticism by the Hong Kong government
The Hong Kong government denounced the executive order as having "[politicized] juridical co-operation." As a result, the Hong Kong government announced that it had, at the central government's instruction, notified the US Consulate General of the suspension of the agreements of surrender of fugitive offenders and of mutual legal assistance on criminal matters.

Hong Kong's commerce secretary Edward Yau condemned USCBP's measures, saying labelling a product from Hong Kong as "made in some other place" was "calling white black". He added that this practice did not comply with WTO rules, as it undermined Hong Kong's status as a separate customs territory.

References 

2020 in American law
Executive orders of Donald Trump
Hong Kong–United States relations
China–United States relations
United States sanctions
Sanctions against China